State Route 677 (SR 677) is a nearly  north–south running state route existing entirely in Vinton County, Ohio.  Its southern terminus is at US 50, slightly to the east of McArthur in Elk Township, and its northern terminus is at SR 278 in Zaleski.  The route passes through rural east-central Vinton County while connecting the two towns. Locally, the route is known as Powder Plant Road, as an Austin Powder Company explosives plant lies along the route.

Route description

All of SR 677 is situated within Vinton County.  The highway is not included as a part of the National Highway System.

History
SR 677 first appeared in 1937 along the path between US 50 and SR 278 that it maintains to this day.  The highway has not experienced any major changes since its first appearance.

Major intersections

References

677
Transportation in Vinton County, Ohio